Michael Stefan Nachmanoff (born 1968) is an American lawyer who serves as a United States district judge of the United States District Court for the Eastern District of Virginia. He served as a magistrate judge of the same court from 2015 to 2021.

Early life and education 

Nachmanoff grew up in Arlington, Virginia. He received his Bachelor of Arts from Wesleyan University in 1991 and his Juris Doctor from the University of Virginia School of Law in 1995. He is Jewish.

Legal career 

After graduating law school, Nachmanoff served as a law clerk for Judge Leonie Brinkema of the United States District Court for the Eastern District of Virginia from 1995 to 1996. After his clerkship, he joined the firm Cohen, Gettings & Dunham, P.C, where he was an associate from 1996 to 2000 and a partner from 2000 to 2002. From 2002 to 2015, Nachmanoff served in the Office of the Federal Public Defender for the Eastern District of Virginia starting as the first assistant public defender from 2002 to 2005, the acting federal public defender from 2005 to 2007, and the chief federal public defender from 2007 to 2015.

In 2007, he argued the case Kimbrough v. United States before the Supreme Court, in which the Court ruled district judges have the discretion to depart from the Federal Sentencing Guidelines in cases involving crack cocaine.

Federal judicial service

United States magistrate judge tenure 

Nachmanoff was sworn in as a United States magistrate judge on March 1, 2015.

District court service 

In April 2021, Senators Mark Warner and Tim Kaine recommended Nachmanoff to be a United States District Judge for the Eastern District of Virginia to the seat vacated by Judge Liam O'Grady. On June 30, 2021, President Joe Biden announced his intent to nominate Nachmanoff to serve as a United States district judge for the United States District Court for the Eastern District of Virginia. On July 13, 2021, his nomination was sent to the Senate. President Biden nominated Nachmanoff to the seat vacated by Judge Anthony Trenga, who assumed senior status on June 1, 2021. On July 28, 2021, a hearing on his nomination was held before the Senate Judiciary Committee. On September 23, 2021, his nomination was reported out of committee by a 13–9 vote. On October 26, 2021, the United States Senate invoked cloture on his nomination by a 51–46 vote. On October 27, 2021, his nomination was confirmed by a 52–46 vote. He received his judicial commission on November 2, 2021.

References

External links 
 
 Appearances at the U.S. Supreme Court from the Oyez Project
 

1968 births
Living people
20th-century American lawyers
21st-century American judges
21st-century American lawyers
Judges of the United States District Court for the Eastern District of Virginia
Lawyers from Washington, D.C.
Public defenders
United States district court judges appointed by Joe Biden
United States magistrate judges
University of Virginia School of Law alumni
Virginia lawyers
Wesleyan University alumni